Early Modern Spanish (also called classical Spanish or Golden Age Spanish, especially in literary contexts) is the variant of Spanish used between the end of the fifteenth century and the end of the seventeenth century, marked by a series of phonological and grammatical changes that transformed Old Spanish into Modern Spanish.

Notable changes from Old Spanish to Early Modern Spanish include: (1) a readjustment of the sibilants (including their devoicing and changes in their place of articulation), (2) the phonemic merger known as yeísmo, (3) the rise of new second-person pronouns, (4) the emergence of the "se lo" construction for the sequence of third-person indirect and direct object pronouns, and (5) new restrictions on the order of clitic pronouns.

Early Modern Spanish corresponds to the period of Spanish colonization of the Americas, and thus it forms the historical basis of all varieties of New World Spanish.

Early Modern Spanish, however, was not uniform throughout the Spanish-speaking regions of Spain. Each change has its own chronology and, in some cases, geography. Slightly different pronunciations existed simultaneously. The Spanish spoken in Toledo was taken as the "best" variety and was different from that of Madrid.

Phonology 

 The phoneme  (from Old Spanish initial ) progressively became silent in most areas, though it still exists for some words in varieties of Andalusia and Extremadura.
 In the Americas, the Canary Islands, and almost all of Andalusia, the apical  merged with laminal  (the resulting phoneme is represented as ).
Both phonemes have remained separate in parts of the Iberian Peninsula and in parts of South America, mainly in Bolivia, Paraguay, and Peru.

Grammar 
 A readjustment of the second-person pronouns differentiates Modern Spanish from Old Spanish. To eliminate the ambiguity of the form vos, which served for both the second-person singular formal and the second-person plural, two alternative forms were created:
 The form usted (< vuesarced < vuestra merced, 'your grace') as a form of respect in the second-person singular.
 The form vosotros (< vos otros) as a usual form of second-person plural. In parts of Andalusia, in the Canary Islands, and in the Americas, however, the form did not take hold, and the form ustedes came to be used for both the formal and the informal second-person plural.
 The loss of the phoneme —through a merger with —caused the medieval forms gelo, gela, gelos, gelas (consisting of an indirect object followed by a direct object) to be reinterpreted as se lo, se la, se los, se las, as in digelo 'I gave it to him/her' > Early Modern Spanish díselo > Modern Spanish se lo di.
 In Early Modern Spanish, clitic pronouns were still often suffixed to a finite verb form, as in Portuguese, but they began to alternate with preverbal forms, which became the norm in Modern Spanish: enfermose and muriose > se enfermó and se murió.

Spelling 
Spelling in Early Modern Spanish was anarchic, unlike the Spanish of today, which is governed and standardized by the Real Academia Española, a semi-governmental body. There was no reference book or other authority writers or compositors could turn to, to find the "correct" spelling of a word. In fact, spelling was not considered very important. Sometimes words were spelled according to their Latin origin, rather than their actual pronunciation (trasumpto instead of trasunto). That presents a challenge to modern editors of texts from the period, who are forced to choose what spelling(s) to use.

References

Notes

Citations

Further reading
 Alvar, Manuel (director), Manual de dialectología hispánica. El Español de España, Ariel Lingüística, Barcelona, 1996 and 2007.
 Cano, Rafael (coord.): Historia de la lengua española, Ariel Lingüística, Barcelona, 2005.
 
 Hualde, José Ignacio (2005): The sounds of Spanish, Cambridge University Press, 2005.
 Penny, Ralph (1993): Gramática histórica del español, Ariel, Barcelona, .

Spanish language
Languages attested from the 15th century